Denver Johnson (born October 17, 1958) is an American football coach and former player. Johnson was the head football coach at Murray State University from 1997 to 1999 and at Illinois State University from 2000 to 2008, and Missouri Southern State University from 2015 to 2018 compiling a career college football record of 72–99. Formerly, he was the offensive line coach for the Tulsa Golden Hurricane from 2011 to the end of the 2014 season. Johnson was let go when head coach Bill Blankenship was fired on December 1, 2014.

Coaching career
Johnson was the 20th head football coach for the Illinois State Redbirds in Normal, Illinois and he held that position for nine seasons, from 2000 until November 22, 2008. Johnson resigned from the program after the Redbirds final game of the 2008 season, a game they lost against Southern Illinois University in overtime, 17–10. His overall coaching record at ISU was 48–54. This ranks him third at ISU in terms of total wins and eighth at ISU in terms of winning percentage.

Prior to coaching at Illinois State, Johnson was the head coach at Murray State University.  He was offensive line coach for Colorado in 2009 and 2010, then moved to Tulsa for the 2011 season to join the coaching staff of Bill Blankenship, who had been his college teammate at Tulsa.

On April 1, 2015, Johnson was named the head coach of the Missouri Southern Lions. Johnson resigned from Missouri Southern after three games into the 2018 season.

Head coaching record

References

Living people
1958 births
American football offensive tackles
Colorado Buffaloes football coaches
Houston Gamblers players
Illinois State Redbirds football coaches
Los Angeles Express players
Mississippi State Bulldogs football coaches
Missouri Southern Lions football coaches
Murray State Racers football coaches
Oklahoma Sooners football coaches
Oklahoma State Cowboys football coaches
UT Martin Skyhawks football coaches
Tulsa Golden Hurricane football players
Tampa Bay Buccaneers players
People from Seminole, Oklahoma